Keith Champagne (born August 4, 1970) is an American comic artist, who has also moved into writing, and is known for his work at DC Comics.

Biography

Keith graduated from Montville High School in Oakdale, Connecticut in 1988. He is a 1994 graduate of the Joe Kubert School of Cartoon and Graphic Art. Keith began working professionally as a comic book inker during his second year at the Kubert School.

Titles he has contributed to (as writer) include: JSA, Green Lantern Corps, and World War III. As an artist/inker, his work has appeared in many titles, most notably JSA, Firestorm, and Superboy.

Recently he wrote Adolescent Radioactive Black Belt Hamsters, when the license was acquired by Dynamite Entertainment.

Upcoming work includes Ghostbusters for IDW Publishing and The Mighty, a creator-owned title for DC Comics, co-written with Peter Tomasi.

Keith currently lives in Mansfield Center, Connecticut.

Bibliography

Comics work includes:

Aztek (pencils (1) and inks (2-10), with authors Grant Morrison/Mark Millar, DC Comics, 1996, tpb, collects Aztek, the Ultimate Man #1-10, 240 pages, April 30, 2008)
World War III #1-2 (script, with pencils by Pat Olliffe and inks by Drew Geraci, 4-issue mini-series, DC Comics, 2007)
Countdown: Arena (script, with art by Scott McDaniel, 4-issue mini-series, DC Comics, December 2007)
Adolescent Radioactive Black Belt Hamsters (script, with Tom Nguyen, 4-issue mini-series, Dynamite Entertainment, January 2008)
Ghostbusters (script, with art by Tom Nguyen, IDW Publishing)
The Mighty (with co-author Peter Tomasi and art by Peter Snejbjerg, 12-issue limited series, DC Comics)
WWE Heroes, 7 issue series, Titan Publishing

Notes

References

Keith Champagne the Unofficial Handbook of Marvel Comics Creators

External links

People from Mansfield, Connecticut
Living people
1970 births